Norway was represented by Anne-Karine Strøm, with the song "The First Day of Love", at the 1974 Eurovision Song Contest, which took place on 6 April in Brighton, England. "The First Day of Love" was chosen as the Norwegian entry at the Melodi Grand Prix on 16 February. Strøm had sung for Norway the previous year as a member of the Bendik Singers, whose other three members provided backing vocals in Brighton.

Before Eurovision

Melodi Grand Prix 1974

The Melodi Grand Prix 1974 was held at the studios of broadcaster NRK in Oslo, hosted by Vidar Lønn-Arnesen. Five songs were presented in the final with each song sung twice by different singers, once with a small combo and once with a full orchestra. The winning song was chosen by voting from a 14-member public jury who each awarded between 1 and 5 points per song. "The First Day of Love" was performed in Norwegian as "Hvor er du" at MGP and was translated into English before going to Brighton.

At Eurovision 
On the night of the final Strøm performed 4th in the running order, following Spain and preceding Greece. The voting for 1974 reverted to the one-point-per-jury-member system and at the close of voting "The First Day of Love" had picked up only 3 points, placing Norway joint last (with Germany, Portugal and Switzerland) of the 17 entries, the third time the country ended the evening at the foot of the scoreboard.

Voting

References

External links 
Full national final on nrk.no

1974
Countries in the Eurovision Song Contest 1974
1974
Eurovision
Eurovision